The Note is a 2007 American-Canadian made-for-television drama film directed by Douglas Barr and starring Genie Francis and Ted McGinley. The film aired on Hallmark Channel on December 8, 2007. It is based on the novel by Angela Hunt and was filmed on location in Hamilton, Ontario.

Plot summary
Newspaper columnist Peyton MacGruder (Genie Francis) finds a note addressed simply to 'T', washed up on shore. It appears to be from the victim of a recent plane crash, and carries a message of hope and forgiveness from a father to his child. MacGruder's readership is down on her column (called "Heart Healer"), and the paper is going to dump it unless she starts to write from the heart. Inspired, MacGruder decides to find the intended recipient of the note, all the while logging her journey through her article. As the mystery unfolds, the note affects each person she contacts significantly.

Cast
 Genie Francis as Peyton MacGruder
 Ted McGinley as Kingston "King" Danville
 Rick Roberts as Truman Harris
 Genelle Williams as Mandi
 Maria Ricossa as Nora
 Katie Boland as Christine
 Jim Codrington as Reverend Tim Lavery
 Heather Hanson as Taylor Quist
 Gord Rand as Tanner Walton

Differences from the novel
 The book does not take place in the winter time, therefore it is not surrounded by the Christmas holiday.
 The book's events take place in Tampa Bay, Florida. In the film, the events transpire in Middleborough, North Carolina.
 In the film, Katie Boland's character is named Christine. In the book, she's named Lila.

Promotion
To support the premiere of the film, Hallmark Channel launched a website on October 22, 2007 called www.WhatWouldYouWrite.com, where viewers could submit their own personalized notes to family and friends and answer the question 'who would you reach out to if you only had a minute?' The website has since been disconnected.

Reception
The Note became Hallmark Channel's highest-rated film of 2007 and third highest all-time rating.

DVD Verdict called it "syrupy", but that fans of other Hallmark Channel-type fare will "find a treasure trove of positivity and middle-aged sexual tension".

Sequel
Due to the success of the movie for Hallmark Channel, a sequel was made, entitled Taking a Chance on Love, which was written by Douglas Barr. The Note author Angela Hunt did a novelization of Barr's script. The original cast returned to reprise their roles.

Another sequel, Notes from the Heart Healer, was broadcast on May 12, 2012.

External links
 The Note on Hallmark Channel

References

2007 television films
2007 films
2007 drama films
American drama films
Canadian drama television films
English-language Canadian films
Films based on American novels
Films shot in Ontario
Hallmark Channel original films
Films directed by Douglas Barr
2000s American films
2000s Canadian films